Suchowola may refer to the following places:
Suchowola, Łódź Voivodeship (central Poland)
Suchowola, Radzyń Podlaski County in Lublin Voivodeship (east Poland)
Suchowola in Podlaskie Voivodeship (north-east Poland)
Suchowola, Zamość County in Lublin Voivodeship (east Poland)
Suchowola, Busko County in Świętokrzyskie Voivodeship (south-central Poland)
Suchowola, Kielce County in Świętokrzyskie Voivodeship (south-central Poland)
Suchowola, Staszów County in Świętokrzyskie Voivodeship (south-central Poland)